Daniel Garbett Nurse (1874–1959) was an English footballer who played in the Football League for West Bromwich Albion and Wolverhampton Wanderers.

References

1874 births
1959 deaths
English footballers
Association football midfielders
English Football League players
West Bromwich Albion F.C. players
Wolverhampton Wanderers F.C. players